The Paavo Nurmi Marathon is an annual marathon road running race held during summer in Turku, Finland, the birth city of Paavo Nurmi. Although various marathons have been held in Turku since 1910, the Paavo Nurmi Marathon was established in 1992. It is arranged along with Paavo Nurmi Games, a part of Paavo Nurmi happening week. The route goes through Turku city and Ruissalo park. The marathon attracts yearly 500 to 1000 participants.

Past results
Key:

See also 
 Helsinki City Marathon

References 
http://championchip.fi/tulospalvelu/F2508646-F52A-4A97-A171-21CE1B55115E+N50+maraton

External links
Paavo Nurmi Marathon (Turku, Finland)

Recurring sporting events established in 1992
Marathons in Europe
Marathons in Finland
Sport in Turku
Foot races in Finland
Marathon
1992 establishments in Finland